Valle Vista (Spanish for "View Valley") is a census-designated place (CDP) in Riverside County, California, United States and is located in the San Jacinto Valley. Some areas of Valle Vista are considered to be part of both unincorporated San Jacinto and Hemet but have yet to be incorporated. The population was 11,036 at the 2010 census, up from 8,356 at the 2000 census.

Geography
Valle Vista is located at  (33.752820, -116.898159).

Surrounding communities

Climate
Valle Vista, generally has year-round pleasant weather, with hot summers and  mild, wet winters. On average, the warmest month is August.
The highest recorded temperature was 115 °F (46 °C) in 2004. On average, the coolest month is December.
The lowest recorded temperature was 9 °F (−13 °C) in 1974. The maximum average precipitation occurs in February.

Demographics

2010
At the 2010 census Valle Vista had a population of 11,036. The racial makeup of Valle Vista was (69.2%) White, (13.0%) African American,(1.7%) Native American,(1.9%) Asian,(0.3%) Pacific Islander,(9.3%) from other races, and (4.6%) from two or more races. Hispanic or Latino (27.6%).

The census reported that 11,036 people (100% of the population) lived in households, 5 (0%) lived in non-institutionalized group quarters, and no one was institutionalized.

There were 5,464 households, 1,762 (32.2%) had children under the age of 18 living in them, 2,738 (50.1%) were opposite-sex married couples living together, 693 (12.7%) had a female householder with no husband present, 327 (6.0%) had a male householder with no wife present. There were 335 (6.1%) unmarried opposite-sex partnerships, and 31 (0.6%) same-sex married couples or partnerships. 1,410 households (25.8%) were one person and 794 (14.5%) had someone living alone who was 65 or older. The average household size was 2.67. There were 3,758 families (68.8% of households); the average family size was 3.20.

The age distribution was 3,630 people (24.9%) under the age of 18, 1,188 people (8.1%) aged 18 to 24, 3,126 people (21.4%) aged 25 to 44, 3,804 people (26.1%) aged 45 to 64, and 2,830 people (19.4%) who were 65 or older. The median age was 41.4 years. For every 100 females, there were 91.9 males.  For every 100 females age 18 and over, there were 90.7 males.

There were 6,112 housing units at an average density of 863.7 per square mile, of the occupied units 4,129 (75.6%) were owner-occupied and 1,335 (24.4%) were rented. The homeowner vacancy rate was 4.4%; the rental vacancy rate was 9.8%. 10,384 people (71.2% of the population) lived in owner-occupied housing units and 4,189 people (28.7%) lived in rental housing units.

2000
At the 2000 census there were 8,356 people, 4,510 households, and 2,963 families in the CDP. The racial makeup of the CDP was 78.6% White, 12.2% African American, 3.3% Native American, 1.3% Asian, 0.2% Pacific Islander, 1.9% from other races, and 2.6% from two or more races. Hispanic or Latino of any race were 13.7%.

Of the 4,510 households 23.2% had children under the age of 18 living with them, 53.8% were married couples living together, 8.8% had a female householder with no husband present, and 34.3% were non-families. 30.3% of households were one person and 21.1% were one person aged 65 or older. The average household size was 2.3 and the average family size was 2.9.

The age distribution was 22.3% under the age of 18, 5.5% from 18 to 24, 20.6% from 25 to 44, 19.9% from 45 to 64, and 31.7% 65 or older. The median age was 46 years. For every 100 females, there were 88.2 males. For every 100 females age 18 and over, there were 84.0 males.

The median household income was $32,455 and the median family income  was $44,504. Males had a median income of $45,765 versus $26,250 for females. The per capita income for the CDP was $18,130. About 8.6% of families and 11.7% of the population were below the poverty line, including 17.0% of those under age 18 and 7.7% of those age 65 or over.

Government

References

Census-designated places in Riverside County, California
Census-designated places in California